The 1935 Purdue Boilermakers football team was an American football team that represented Purdue University during the 1935 college football season.  In their sixth season under head coach Noble Kizer, the Boilermakers compiled a 4–4 record, finished in third place in the Big Ten Conference with a 3–3 record against conference opponents, and outscored opponents by a total of 65 to 57. Ed Skoronski was the team captain.

Schedule

References

Purdue
Purdue Boilermakers football seasons
Purdue Boilermakers football